The Santa Rita Mountains (O'odham: To:wa Kuswo Doʼag), located about 65 km (40 mi) southeast of Tucson, Arizona, extend 42 km (26 mi) from north to south, then trending southeast. They merge again southeastwards into the Patagonia Mountains, trending northwest by southeast. The highest point in the range,  and the highest point in the Tucson area, is Mount Wrightson, with an elevation of 9,453 feet (2,881 m), The range contains Madera Canyon, one of the world's premier birding areas.  The Smithsonian Institution's Fred Lawrence Whipple Observatory is located on Mount Hopkins. The range is one of the Madrean sky islands.

The Santa Rita Mountains are mostly within the Coronado National Forest. Prior to 1908 they were the principal component of Santa Rita National Forest, which was combined with other small forest tracts to form Coronado. Much of the range lies within the Mt. Wrightson Wilderness, managed by the Coronado National Forest. The Santa Rita Mountains were severely burned in July 2005 in the Florida Fire.

On the western side of the northern Santa Rita Mountains, a large cliff face of white marble is visible from the Green Valley and Sahuarita areas. This "white scar" reminded early Spanish missionaries of Saint Rita of Cascia (1381-1457), an Italian nun, who is often depicted with a small wound on her forehead. The mountain range was consequently named after her.

Other mountain ranges surrounding the Tucson valley include the Santa Catalina Mountains, the Rincon Mountains, the Tucson Mountains, and the Tortolita Mountains.

Rosemont mine
A large porphyry copper deposit has been identified near the old Helvetia mining district on the north flank of the range. The proposed Rosemont Copper mine would be an open pit operation located in the Santa Ritas about two miles west of mile marker 44 on Arizona State Route 83.

Jaguars
The Santa Rita Mountains were the temporary home range of "El Jefe," an adult male jaguar first identified in 2011. He has not been seen since 2015 and it is presumed that he returned to Mexico, where the nearest breeding population of jaguars is located.

Gallery

See also

 List of mountain ranges of Arizona
 Empire Ranch
 Madera Canyon (Arizona)
 Battle of Fort Buchanan
 Larcena Pennington Page

References

External links

 Mt. Wrightson Wilderness Coronado National Forest
 Friends of Madera Canyon
 Birding hot spots
 Whipple Observatory

 
Mountain ranges of Pima County, Arizona
Mountain ranges of Santa Cruz County, Arizona
Madrean Sky Islands mountain ranges
Coronado National Forest
Geography of Tucson, Arizona
Mountain ranges of Arizona